Highway 20 is an East-West highway in northern Jordan. It is the main axis through Ajloun Governorate connecting it to Jerash and Mafraq.

Roads in Jordan